A Fraud Squad is a police department which investigates fraud and other economic crimes.

Fraud squad (United Kingdom)
Garda Fraud Squad 

Fraud squad may also refer to:

Fraud Squad (duo),  musical partnership between Daz Sampson and with JJ Mason
Fraud Squad (film) or The Big Call, 2017 Chinese crime drama directed by Oxide Pang
Fraud Squad TV, Canadian documentary television series aimed at raising awareness about the global problem of fraud

See also
Fraud